The Women's Super-G competition in the 2016 FIS Alpine Skiing World Cup involved sight events, including the season final in St. Moritz, Switzerland.  

The season competition was a two-person battle between 2014 discipline champion Lara Gut from Switzerland and defending discipline champion (and five-time winner) Lindsey Vonn from the USA.  Vonn won all of the first three races, but she suffered a season-ending injury in the sixth.  Coming into the finals, Gut was still behind Vonn, but she and two other racers (Liechtenstein's Tina Weirather and Austria's Cornelia Hütter) could overtake Vonn with strong performances in the finals. Gut's second-place finish (worth 80 points) gave her the season title, while Weirather's victory (worth 100 points) enabled her to edge into second, with Vonn relegated to third.

Standings

DNF = Did Not Finish
DSQ = Disqualified
DNS = Did Not Start

See also
 2016 Alpine Skiing World Cup – Women's summary rankings
 2016 Alpine Skiing World Cup – Women's Overall
 2016 Alpine Skiing World Cup – Women's Downhill
 2016 Alpine Skiing World Cup – Women's Giant Slalom
 2016 Alpine Skiing World Cup – Women's Slalom
 2016 Alpine Skiing World Cup – Women's Combined

References

External links
 Alpine Skiing at FIS website

Women's Super-G
FIS Alpine Ski World Cup women's Super-G discipline titles